Peter Forman (born April 28, 1958, in Plymouth, Massachusetts) is president and CEO of the South Shore (MA) Chamber of Commerce. He was formerly an American politician who served as a member of the Massachusetts House of Representatives, Sheriff of Plymouth County, Massachusetts, and as a member of the Paul Celucci and Jane M. Swift administrations.

Massachusetts House of Representatives
Forman represented the 1st Plymouth District in the Massachusetts House of Representatives from 1981 to 1995. He was the Minority Whip from 1989 to 1991 and in 1991 succeeded the departing Steven Pierce as House Minority Leader. Forman was a candidate for Secretary of the Commonwealth of Massachusetts in 1994, but lost in the Republican primary to State Senator Arthur E. Chase.

Sheriff of Plymouth County
On November 21, 1994, Forman was appointed by Governor William Weld to serve as Plymouth County Sheriff. In 1996 he defeated Patricia Lawton in a special election to finish the term of former Sheriff Peter Flynn. He was elected to his first full term in 1998; defeating Halifax Selectman Troy Garron. Forman resigned as Sheriff less than a year later to join the Cellucci administration.

Cellucci and Swift administrations
Forman joined the Cellucci administration as Deputy Secretary of Administration and Finance. When Jane M. Swift succeeded Cellucci as Governor, she named Forman her Chief of Staff. As Swift's Chief of Staff, Forman helped the acting Governor in her attempt to remove Christy Mihos and Jordan Levy from the Massachusetts Turnpike Authority board and with the shakeup at the Massachusetts Port Authority following the September 11 attacks. While Swift was on a "working maternity leave" following the birth of her twin daughters, Forman carried out many key duties of the Governor's office.

Forman was fired by Swift on January 23, 2002. Following his dismissal, he worked without pay to help Swift's running mate Patrick Guerriero prepare to face Jim Rappaport at the Republican Convention.

References

1958 births
Republican Party members of the Massachusetts House of Representatives
Massachusetts sheriffs
People from Plymouth, Massachusetts
Colby College alumni
Living people
Chiefs of staff to United States state governors